Asi Abutbul (born 1975) is an Israeli mobster. In May 2006 Abutbul was arrested by Israel Police, along with another mobster, Eli Naim, on suspicions that he sold weapons to Naim with criminal intent.

BMW importer Kamoor was caught giving Abutbul 2 cars free of charge. In 2008, Abutbul was sentenced to 18 months in prison for selling weapons to gangs in Jerusalem and Netanya. On June 21, 2009, Abutbul and 19 of his men were sent to jail. Abutbul was sentenced to 13 years in prison.

References

1975 births
Living people
Israeli Jews
Crime bosses
Israeli gangsters

he:אסי אבוטבול